The Quarters may refer to:

 The Quarters (band), an Australian musical group
 The Quarters, Hursley Park, a cricket ground in Hampshire, England
 The Quarters, Edmonton, Canada
 The Quarters (TV series), Malaysian production
The Quarters, a horse-racing TV program airing on FanDuel TV